Mustangs FC is a 2017 Australian comedy-drama TV series aimed at young teenagers and starring Emmanuelle Mattana as the lead character. The show is set in suburban Australia, and focuses on Mustangs FC, an all-girls soccer team, and focuses on Mattana's character, Marnie, who lives with her mother, Jen (played by Pia Miranda), her mother's boyfriend, Kev, and Kev's daughter, Lara, as well as Marnie's friends and teammates. Launched on International Day of the Girl in 2017, the show explores the relationship between team members, and the struggle to be taken seriously as an all-girls team. The show is airing in the US on Universal Kids.

Mustangs FC was created by Amanda Higgs and Rachel Davis and produced by Davis and Higgs, with Debbie Lee serving as executive producer. The show was produced by Matchbox Pictures for ABC Me alongside the Australian Broadcasting Corporation, Screen Australia in association with Film Victoria. In October 2017, the show was nominated for Best Children's television series at the AACTA Awards Mustangs FC was renewed for a second season on 29 June 2018, and aired on 1 January 2019.

Cast

 Emmanuelle Mattana as Marnie
 Ashleigh Marshall as Liv 
 Gemma Chua-Tran as Anusha
 Molly Broadstock as Bella
 Celine Ajobong as Ruby
 Monique Heath	as Lara
 Natasha Pearson as Michaela 
 Pia Miranda as Jen
 Stephen Hall as Kev
 Jacek Koman as Danny
 Xavier West as Gabe
 Celia Pacquola as the narrator
 Tommy Little as the manager

Supporting
 Martha Berhane as Freya
 Hayet Dabbouss as Hanifa
 Tara Jakubowskij as Willow
 Lottie Van Vijick as Alex
 Emily Carnibella as Simone 
 Chelsea Ford as Magda
 Georgia Kirby as Trinity
 Jessica Faulkner as Madison
 Christie Whelan as Terry
 Fiona Choi as Cindy
 Mike McLeish as Sam
 Catherine Glavicic as Alicia
 Luke Christopoulos as Tom
 Ellmir Asipi as Hamet
 Clare Chihambakwe as Michelle
 Sophie Ashdowne as Summah
 Mitchell Lockhart as Miles
 Phoenix Raei as Lachy
 Rhett Shreuder as Jasper
 Tharanya Tharan as Zee
 Miah Grace Madden as Jas
 Imogen Lamble as Georgie

Episodes

Reception 
The show received positive reviews, with Melinda Houston of The Canberra Times rating the show four out of five stars and receiving an AACTA award nomination for Best Children's television series. The show's premiere drew an audience of 38,000.

References

External links 
 
 
Mustangs FC on iView
Mustangs FC on iTunes

Australian children's television series
Australian Broadcasting Corporation original programming
2010s teen drama television series
Australian comedy-drama television series
2017 Australian television series debuts
Fictional association football television series
Television series about teenagers
Television series by Matchbox Pictures